Hugh O'Flaherty  (28 February 1898 – 30 October 1963), was an Irish Catholic priest and senior official of the Roman Curia, and a significant figure in Catholic resistance to Nazism. During World War II, O'Flaherty was responsible for saving 6,500 Allied soldiers and Jews. His ability to evade the traps set by the German Gestapo and Sicherheitsdienst (SD), earned O'Flaherty the nickname "The Scarlet Pimpernel of the Vatican". After the Second World War he was named a papal domestic prelate by Pope Pius XII and served as notary of the Holy Office, working alongside and assisting Alfredo Cardinal Ottaviani until 1960.

Early life
Shortly after Hugh O'Flaherty's birth in Lisrobin, Kiskeam, County Cork, his parents, James and Margaret, moved to Killarney. The family lived on the golf course where James O'Flaherty worked as a steward. By his late teens, young O'Flaherty had a scratch handicap and a scholarship to a teacher training college.

However, in 1918 he enrolled at Mungret College, a Jesuit college in County Limerick dedicated to preparing young men for missionary priesthood. Normally, students ranged from 14 to 18 years of age. At the time when O'Flaherty came in, he was a little older than most of the students, about 20. The college allowed for some older people to come in if they had been accepted by a bishop who would pay for them.

O'Flaherty's sponsor was the Bishop of Cape Town, Cornelius O'Reilly, in whose diocese he would be posted after ordination, a big step for a young man who had never set foot outside of Munster. At the time when O'Flaherty was in Mungret, the Irish War for Independence was ongoing. He was posted to Rome in 1922 to finish his studies and was ordained on 20 December 1925. He never joined his diocese however, staying to work for the Holy See and serving as a Vatican diplomat in Egypt, Haiti, Santo Domingo, and Czechoslovakia. In 1934, he was appointed a papal chamberlain with the title of Monsignor. He was originally ascribed to the Sacred Congregation De Propaganda Fide through which, 
in collaboration with the Cardinal Prefect, H.Em. Pietro of the marquesses Fumasoni Biondi and the Pro-Rector of the Pontifical Urban College De Propaganda Fide, Monsignor Saverio Maria of the barons Paventi di San Bonaventura, he began to establish his precious network of assistants with whom he managed to save approximately 6,500 people amongst civilians, military and Jews, whom he lodged in Vatican extraterritorial residences and religious institutes during the Nazi occupation of Rome in the Second World War. It was as a result of that activity, carried out while evading repeated traps by Herbert Kappler and Pietro Koch, that he was given the name of "The Scarlet Pimpernel of the Vatican".

World War II
In the early years of World War II, O'Flaherty toured prisoner of war (POW) camps in Italy and tried to find out about prisoners who had been reported missing in action. If he found them alive, he tried to reassure their families through Radio Vatican.

When Mussolini was removed from power by the King in 1943, thousands of Allied POWs were released; however, when Germany imposed an occupation over Italy, they were in danger of recapture. Some of them, remembering visits by O'Flaherty, reached Rome and asked him for help. Others went to the Irish embassy to the Holy See, the only English-speaking embassy to remain open in Rome during the war. Delia Murphy, who was the wife of Thomas J. Kiernan, the Irish ambassador (and, in her day, a well-known ballad singer), was one of those who helped O'Flaherty.

O'Flaherty did not wait for permission from his superiors. He recruited the help of other priests (including two young New Zealanders, Fathers Owen Snedden and John Flanagan), two agents working for the Free French, François de Vial and Yves Debroise, Communists and a Swiss count. One of his aides was British Major Sam Derry, a POW escapee. Derry along with British officers and escaped POWs Lieutenants Furman and Simpson, and Captain Byrnes, a Canadian, were responsible for the security and operational organisation. O'Flaherty also kept contact with Sir D'Arcy Osborne, British Ambassador to the Holy See, and his butler John May (whom O'Flaherty described as "a genius ... the most magnificent scrounger"). O'Flaherty and his allies concealed 4,000 escapees, mainly Allied soldiers and Jews, in flats, farms and convents. Among those sheltered was one Ines Gistron and a Jewish friend whom O'Flaherty placed in a pensione run by Canadian nuns at Monteverde (Rome), where they were given false IDs.

One of the first hideouts was beside the local SS headquarters. O'Flaherty and Derry coordinated all this from his room at the Collegio Teutonico. When outside the Vatican, O'Flaherty wore various disguises. The German occupiers tried to stop him and eventually they found out that the leader of the network was a priest. SS attempts to assassinate him failed. They learned his identity, but could not arrest him inside the Vatican. When the German ambassador revealed this to O'Flaherty, he began to meet his contacts on the stairs of St. Peter's Basilica.

Obersturmbannführer Herbert Kappler, the head of the SS Sicherheitsdienst and Gestapo in Rome, learned of O'Flaherty's actions; he ordered a white line painted on the pavement at the opening of St. Peter's Square (signifying the border between Vatican City and Italy), stating that the priest would be killed if he crossed it. Pietro Koch, head of the Banda Koch, a special task force charged with hunting down partisans and rounding up deportees for the Germans, often spoke of his intention to torture O'Flaherty before executing him if he ever fell into his hands.

Several others, including priests, nuns and lay people, worked in secret with O'Flaherty, and even hid refugees in their own private homes around Rome. Among these were the Augustinian Maltese Fathers Egidio Galea, Aurelio Borg and Ugolino Gatt, the Dutch Augustinian Father Anselmus Musters and Brother Robert Pace of the Brothers of Christian Schools. Another person who contributed significantly to this operation was Chetta Chevalier, who hid some refugees in her house with her children, and escaped detection. Jewish religious services were conducted in the Basilica di San Clemente, which was under Irish diplomatic protection, under a painting of Tobias.

When the Allies arrived in Rome in June 1944, 6,425 of the escapees were still alive. O'Flaherty demanded that German prisoners be treated properly as well. He took a plane to South Africa to meet Italian POWs and to Jerusalem to visit Jewish refugees. Of the 9,700 Jews in Rome, 1,007 had been shipped to Auschwitz. The rest were hidden, over 5,000 of them by the Church − 300 in Castel Gandolfo, 200 or 400 (estimates vary) as "members" of the Palatine Guard and some 1,500 in monasteries, convents and colleges. The remaining 3,700 were hidden in private homes.

At the time of the liberation of Rome, O'Flaherty's and Derry's organisation was caring for 3,925 escapees and men who had succeeded in evading arrest. Of these 1,695 were British, 896 South African, 429 Russian, 425 Greek and 185 American. The remainder were from 20 different nations.  This does not include Jews and sundry other men and women who were in O'Flaherty's personal care.

Post-war life
After the war O'Flaherty received a number of awards, including appointment as a Commander of the Order of the British Empire (CBE) "for services to the Forces in Italy" and the US Medal of Freedom with Silver Palm. He was also honoured by Canada and Australia. He refused to use the lifetime pension that Italy had given him. In 1954 he was promoted to domestic prelate. In the 1950s, the Chaplet of the Divine Mercy, in the form proposed by the now-canonised Mary Faustina Kowalska, was under a ban from the Vatican. It was O'Flaherty who, as Notary, signed the document that notified Catholics of the ban. He was the first Irishman named Notary of the Holy Office.

O'Flaherty regularly visited his old nemesis Herbert Kappler (the former SS chief in Rome), in prison, month after month, being Kappler's only visitor. In 1959, Kappler converted to Catholicism and was baptised by O'Flaherty.

In 1960, O'Flaherty suffered a serious stroke during Mass and was forced to return to Ireland. Shortly before his first stroke in 1960, he was due to be confirmed as the Papal Nuncio to Tanzania. He moved to Cahersiveen to live with his sister, at whose home he died on 30 October 1963, aged 65. He was buried in the cemetery of the Daniel O'Connell Memorial Church in Cahersiveen. There is a monument in Killarney town and a grove of trees dedicated to his memory in the Killarney National Park.

Some sources incorrectly state that, in 2003, he became the first Irish person honoured as Righteous Among the Nations by the State of Israel. However, according to the list of those honoured, this is not the case. An application to have him added to the rolls was being prepared in 2017.

Dramatization
O'Flaherty was portrayed by Gregory Peck in the 1983 television film, The Scarlet and the Black, which follows the exploits of O'Flaherty from the German occupation of Rome to its liberation by the Allies.

He was also the second principal character in a radio play by Robin Glendinning on Kappler's time seeking asylum in the Vatican, titled The Scarlet Pimpernel of the Vatican, which was first broadcast on 30 November 2006 on Radio 4, with Wolf Kahler as Kappler.

Killarney-born actor and playwright Donal Courtney penned a new one-man play entitled "God has no Country", which he premièred in Killarney as part of the Hugh O Flaherty memorial celebrations for 3 nights in October 2013. Courtney portrays the O'Flaherty during the wartime years in German-occupied Rome; the story is told from the O'Flaherty's point of view and is a study of the torment and difficulty in the decisions he undertook in his fight for justice.

In 2023 Joseph O’Connor published “My Father’s House”, a novel based on the exploits of O’Flaherty and his resistance group.

Television
The Irish-language television station TG4 broadcast a 51-minute documentary on O'Flaherty in 2008. It is available (in mixed Irish/English with English subtitles) on a region-free DVD entitled The Pimpernel of the Vatican – The Amazing Story of Monsignor Hugh O'Flaherty.

References

Further reading
 'The Rome Escape Line: The Story of the British Organization in Rome for assisting Escaped Prisoners-of-war 1943–44.', by Sam Derry (1960)
 William C. Simpson 1996, A Vatican Lifeline, Sparedon Press. 
 Stephen Walker 2011, Hide & Seek: The Irish Priest in the Vatican Who Defied The Nazi Command, HarperCollins (London). 
 Gallagher, J.P. (2009). The Scarlet and the Black: The True Story of Monsignor Hugh O'Flaherty, Hero of the Vatican Underground. San Francisco: Ignatius Press.
 'The Vatican Pimpernel: The Wartime Exploits of Monsignor Hugh O'Flaherty.', by Brian Fleming (2008)
 Alison Walsh 2010, Hugh O'Flaherty: His Wartime Adventures, Collins Press.

External links
 Monsignor Hugh O'Flaherty: Hero of the Vatican
 The Scarlet Pimpernel of the Vatican
 Hugh O'Flaherty Memorial Society

1898 births
1963 deaths
Irish anti-fascists
Irish humanitarians
Diplomats of the Holy See
Commanders of the Order of the British Empire
Recipients of the Medal of Freedom
Irish people of World War II
20th-century Irish Roman Catholic priests
Clergy from County Kerry
People from Killarney
People who rescued Jews during the Holocaust
Irish expatriates in Italy
Vatican City in World War II
Irish expatriates in Egypt
Irish expatriates in Haiti
Irish expatriates in the Dominican Republic
Christian clergy from County Cork